Aspects of Physics is an instrumental experimental music band from San Diego.  It was formed in 2000 by ex-members of the enigmatic math rock band Physics.  Founding members Jason Soares, JFRE "Robot" Coad, and Thatcher Orbitashi released their debut album Systems of Social Recalibration on July 2, 2002, on San Diego label imputor?  They tend to mix indie rock guitar samplings along with minimalist electronic beats and productions.

Thatcher Orbitashi has since left the band, and Aspects of Physics have added additional musicians with Rob Crow on guitars and Arturo Ulloa and Brent Asbury on drums. Their second album titled Marginalized Information Forms 1: Ping, the first in a three part series, was released on October 5, 2004, by imputor? Records.

As a staple of the San Diego electronic music scene, Aspects of Physics has been nominated in the Best Electronic category at the San Diego Music Awards every year from 2002 to 2006.  Their popularity has expanded well beyond San Diego, embarking on North American tours with such notable bands as Album Leaf, Pinback, Mates of State, and Plastiq Phantom.

Members 
Jason Soares - Programming, Guitars, Electronics (See also: Physics, Rice, Thingy)
Jeff Coad aka JFRE "Robot" Coad - Programming, Guitars, Electronics (See also: Physics)
Rob Crow - Guitars (See also: Physics, Pinback, Thingy, Heavy Vegetable, Optiganally Yours)
Arturo Ulloa - Drums (See also: Chune, Physics)
Brent Asbury - Drums (See also: Thingy)
Matt Lorenz - Visuals

Former Member 
Thatcher Orbitashi - Keyboards, Electronics

Discography
Systems of Social Recalibration (2002)
"Pulse Width"
"Level 4.2"
"S.Id"
"Reson"
"Everything Else We Must Pass O"
"Entrainment"
"Contact"

Marginalized Information Forms One: Ping (2004)
"Logo (Observer)"
"Ping"
"Neutrino"
"QQ47"
"Piano Pill"
"Plippus"
"Ohmf"
"Reversevent"
"Jatchtas"
"Arnologer"
"Scene of Changery"

Marginalized Information Forms Two:   (2007)
"Logo (Medium)"
" "
"Monumentum"
"Unthousand Done"
"Recall Seaqence"
"Intrastrings"
"Blipsklippel"
"Bitty Odissey"
"E2 (Crushendo Mix)"
"Vortex Methods"
"Slow Grey Sun"
"Cut and Pastie"

Marginalized Information Forms Three: Other (2009)
"Logo (Other)"
"Level 3"
"Unwindings Are Sound"
"Oscilloscape"
"That Which Resists"
"Underclock"
"Default Actions"
"Psyklur"
"Junoverse"
"Swip Melp"

External links 
 
 Aspects of Physics at Imputor? Records

American experimental musical groups
Musical groups from San Diego
Musical groups established in 2000